Pandan Indah (Jawi: ڤندان اينده) is a major township in Ampang, Kuala Lumpur, Malaysia.  It is located between Ampang proper and Cheras.

Pandan Indah has the basic facilities of a modern Malaysian township - it has a police station, a fire station, a primary and a secondary school and two neighbourhood shopping malls - Pandan Kapital and Mid-Point Shopping Complex.

Facilities
Majlis Perbandaran Ampang Jaya (MPAJ) main headquarters
Balai Polis Pandan Indah
Balai Bomba Pandan Indah
Taman Rekreasi Pandan Indah
Pangsapuri Hospital Ampang
Hospital Ampang

Education
Sekolah Kebangsaan Pandan Indah
Sekolah Menengah Kebangsaan Pandan Indah

Transport

Public transport

Though named as such, the  Pandan Indah LRT station does not directly serve Pandan Indah. The  Cempaka station is much closer.

Car
Pandan Indah is well connected with other towns in Selangor and Kuala Lumpur. The MRR2 Federal Route 28 runs through the western flank of Pandan Indah, linking it with Ampang, Ulu Klang as well as Cheras and Sri Petaling. Also, the extension of the Besraya Expressway which opened in July 2014 reduced travelling time from Ampang and Pandan Indah districts to downtown Kuala Lumpur, Sungai Besi and Petaling Jaya.

Politics
Pandan Indah is part of the Pandan parliamentary constituency, currently represented by Wan Azizah Wan Ismail of PKR.

On the state level, Pandan Indah straddles two state seats - Cempaka and Teratai. Following a 2016 re-delineation exercise, Pandan Indah is set to become its own state constituency, succeeding the current Cempaka state constituency.

References

Townships in Selangor